The Frederick C. Bogk House is Frank Lloyd Wright's only single-family residential project in Milwaukee, Wisconsin. Bogk was an alderman and secretary-treasurer of the Ricketson Paint Works. This house embodies Wright's prairie style elements into a solid-looking structure that appears impregnable.

History 

In the mid-1910s, developer Arthur Richards was promoting Wright's new American System-Built Homes, which were standardized home designs for moderate income housing. During this time, Wright had designed several projects for associates of Richards, but only two were built: the Munkwitz Apartments (Milwaukee, 1916), and this residence for Frederick C. Bogk. By this time, Wright's popularity was in decline, mostly due to personal troubles. The house was designed in 1916, shortly after the murder of his mistress, Mamah Borthwick, and destruction of the residential wing at his home, Taliesin, and during the same period as his Imperial Hotel in Tokyo.

The house was built in 1917 at a cost of $15,000. The current owners, Robert and Barbara Elsner, purchased the home in 1955.

Design 

The façade of the Bogk house, with its buff brick columns framing leaded art glass windows, capped by decorative cast concrete under broad eaves and a low pitched hip roof suggests the influence of the Imperial Hotel in Japan, which was under construction at the time this house was built. The sophisticated balance of horizontal and vertical lines further reflects the strong Japanese influence.

The understated entrance is located at the side of the house, opening onto the driveway. The first-floor interior is a fluid succession of rooms sprawling under a low-lying ceiling. The living room extends across the front of the house, with a dining room at the right rear of the living room, up a few steps. A bedroom above the attached garage at the rear was for the maid; this extends out of the rectangular plan of the main house. There are four bedrooms and a sitting room upstairs.

Tall, narrow leaded glass windows both frame the regular windows, and appear by themselves as design elements. Similar glass panes are embedded in interior brick walls, with lights behind. There is a tiled goldfish pond against one wall of the living room, and a plaque above it with an image of cranes. Built-in light fixtures and other decorative elements are common. There is some built-in furniture, such as desks and bookshelves. The other furniture is not original to the house, but is Wright's design. The current carpeting is a reproduction of Wright's original design.

References

 Storrer, William Allin. The Frank Lloyd Wright Companion. University Of Chicago Press, 2006,  (S.196)

External links
WRIGHT AND LIKE: MILWAUKEE TOUR
Architecture Travel: Unpronounceable, Unforgettable Bogk

 UWM Libraries Digital Collections : Item Viewer
Wright in Wisconsin 
Photos on Arcaid
Bogk House on LoC

Frank Lloyd Wright buildings
Houses on the National Register of Historic Places in Wisconsin
Houses in Milwaukee
National Register of Historic Places in Milwaukee
Prairie School architecture in Wisconsin
Houses completed in 1917